Eastside Early College High School (formerly Johnston High School, Eastside Memorial High School) is located in Austin, Texas. It is a part of the Austin Independent School District (AISD).

History
In August 2008, Eastside Memorial High School opened in accord with AISD's reconstitution plan for the former Albert Sidney Johnston High School.  The following year in August 2009, the AISD Board of Trustees voted to split the school into two separate programs, each with its own principal. The resultant schools were Eastside Memorial Global Tech (for grades 9-10,) under the leadership of Moises Ortiz, and Eastside Memorial Green Tech (for grades 9-12), under the leadership of Connor Grady. The two programs were merged back into a single school in May 2011, using the Public Education Information Management System (PEIMS) number of Green Tech. In October 2011, AISD Superintendent Meria Carstarphen announced a proposal the Eastside Memorial High School and Allan Elementary School could be managed by IDEA Public Schools, a charter organization from the Rio Grande Valley. In December, the AISD Board of Trustees approved the proposal for Allan Elementary School, with the charter expanding into Eastside Memorial in Fall 2013. One year later, in December 2014, the contract with IDEA was cancelled for both schools.

In December 2011, principal Joseph Coburn resigned, and Bryan Miller was named Interim Principal. Miller was confirmed as principal by the AISD Board of Trustees in March 2012.

The AISD Board of Trustees voted unanimously to contract with Talent Development Secondary of Johns Hopkins University to manage Eastside Memorial High School in May 2013. In April 2017, TEA announced that Eastside Memorial would become one of 3 high schools in AISD to offer an Early College High School program where students have the opportunity to earn high school diploma and associate degree. The school would be officially renamed to Eastside Memorial Early College High School in August 2017.

As part of AISD's 2017 Bond program, Eastside Memorial relocated from the Johnston Campus to the Original L.C. Anderson High School campus. A new school building was built on the site. Since the school's namesake memorial remained at the Johnston campus, the school was renamed to Eastside Early College High School in April 2021.

Sports
 Football
 Volleyball
 Baseball
 Softball
 Boys and Girls Cross Country
 Boys and Girls Basketball
 Boys and Girls Wrestling
 Boys and Girls Soccer
 Boys and Girls Track
 Boys and Girls Tennis

References

High schools in Austin, Texas
Austin Independent School District high schools
Educational institutions established in 2008
2008 establishments in Texas